UFC Fight Night: Belfort vs. Henderson 2 (also known as UFC Fight Night 32) was a mixed martial arts event held on November 9, 2013, at the Goiânia Arena in Goiânia, Brazil. The event was broadcast live on Fox Sports 1.

Background
The event was headlined by a rematch between longtime multi-divisional contenders Vitor Belfort and Dan Henderson. Henderson defeated Belfort in their first encounter in 2006 at Pride 32 in a unanimous decision.

The co-main event featured the long-awaited bout between The Ultimate Fighter: Brazil competitors Cezar Ferreira and Daniel Sarafian. Both men were originally scheduled to face each other in the finale to determine the winner of the inaugural TUF series for Brazil. However, Sarafian injured himself before the finale in June 2012 and was forced out of the finals.

Thiago Tavares was expected to face Quinn Mulhern at the event. However, Mulhern pulled out of the bout citing an injury and was replaced by Justin Salas.

Johnny Eduardo and Lucas Martins were originally scheduled to face each other in a bantamweight bout on this card. However, both fighters were injured and the fight was removed from the event.

Results

Bonus awards
The following fighters were awarded $50,000 bonuses.

 Fight of the Night: Omari Akhmedov vs. Thiago Perpétuo 
 Knockout of the Night: Vitor Belfort
 Submission of the Night: Adriano Martins

See also
List of UFC events
2013 in UFC

References

UFC Fight Night
2013 in mixed martial arts
Mixed martial arts in Brazil
Sport in Goiânia
2013 in Brazilian sport